Events from the year 1992 in Uruguay

Incumbents 
 President: Luis Alberto Lacalle

Events 

 On 30th June, 1992, a total solar eclipse in Uruguay ( for about 5m21s)

Sport

Unknown dates 
 Uruguay at the 1992 Summer Olympics in Barcelona, Spain

Births in 1992 

 January 22 – Gonzalo Barreto, footballer
 July 27 – Ramón Arias, footballer

Deaths in 1992

References